Phyllogomphus annulus is a species of dragonfly in the family Gomphidae. It is found in Angola, the Democratic Republic of the Congo, and Uganda. Its natural habitats are subtropical or tropical moist lowland forests and intermittent rivers.

References

Gomphidae
Taxonomy articles created by Polbot
Insects described in 1944